Kevin John Parada (born August 3, 2001) is an American baseball catcher in the New York Mets organization.

Amateur career
Parada attended Loyola High School in Los Angeles, California. He finished his high school career with a .390 batting average, nine home runs, 66 RBIs, and 24 doubles. He was considered a top prospect for the 2020 Major League Baseball draft, but went unselected, and enrolled at Georgia Tech to play college baseball.

Parada was instantly put into the starting lineup at catcher as a freshman in 2021. Over 52 games, he slashed .318/.370/.550 with nine home runs and 42 RBIs alongside twenty doubles which led the Atlantic Coast Conference, earning Freshman All-American honors. Parada played nine games in the Cape Cod Baseball League with the Chatham Anglers over the summer of 2021. He was also named to the USA Baseball Collegiate National Team with whom he spent part of the summer. Parada entered the 2022 season as a top prospect for the upcoming draft. On March 1, 2022, he was named the National Player of the Week by Collegiate Baseball Newspaper after a week in which he went 12-21 with five home runs and 17 RBIs. On March 29, in a 17-3 win versus the Charleston Southern Buccaneers, Parada had his first ever two-home run game. After he hit his 26th home run of the season, he set the Georgia Tech single season home run record, breaking the previous record set by Anthony Maisano in 1990. Parada ended the season having played in sixty games, compiling a .361/.453/.709 slash line with 26 home runs and 88 RBIs. Following the season's end, he traveled to San Diego where he participated in the Draft Combine.

Professional career
The New York Mets selected Parada in the first round with the 11th overall selection of the 2022 Major League Baseball draft. He signed with the team for $5 million.

Parada made his professional debut with the Rookie-level Florida Complex League Mets and was promoted to the St. Lucie Mets of the Single-A Florida State League after three games. Over 13 games between the two teams, he hit .275 with one home run and eight RBIs.

Personal life
Parada's mother, Darlene, played college softball at Woodbury University.

References

External links
Georgia Tech Yellow Jackets bio

2001 births
Living people
People from Pasadena, California
Baseball players from California
Baseball catchers
Georgia Tech Yellow Jackets baseball players
United States national baseball team players
Chatham Anglers players
All-American college baseball players
Florida Complex League Mets players
St. Lucie Mets players